Chimney Tops is a mountain in the central Great Smoky Mountains in Tennessee. Chimney Tops is a double-capstone knob on the eastern slope of the Sugarland Mountain massif, which stretches north-south across the north-central section of the Smokies. Mount Le Conte resides east of Chimney Tops and Mt. Mingus southeast of Chimney Tops. Thus, while the view from the summit is 360 degrees, Chimney Tops is practically "walled in" on three sides.

Geology

Chimney Tops is one of the few instances of a bare rock summit in the Smokies.  The rock atop the mountain has been exposed to natural weathering. The bedrock is mostly Anakeesta Formation metamorphic rock, especially slate, phyllite, and metasiltstone. It was formed 200 million years ago when the North American and African plates collided during the Appalachian orogeny.

History

The Cherokee name for Chimney Tops is Duniskwalgunyi, or "forked antler", referring to its resemblance to the deer antlers. In the Cherokee legend "Aganunitsi and the Uktena", the captured medicine man, Aganunitsi, to free himself, searches remote parts of the Smokies to find the giant reptile, the Uktena, and seize an amulet from its forehead. In his quest, Aganunitsi searches distant gaps and peaks in the Smokies before going to Duniskwalgunyi, the Gap of the Forked Antler, and to the lake of Atagahi, and at each found monstrous reptiles."

The Road Prong Trail, which follows the stream of the same name at the base of Chimney Tops, is one of the oldest trails in the Smokies. In the 18th and 19th centuries, the ancient path was known commonly as the Indian Gap Trail. In 1832, the Oconaluftee Turnpike was constructed between Indian Gap and Smokemont. The road was expanded during the Civil War by Cherokee leader Col. Will Thomas, running parallel to the modern trail.

The mountain's current name was probably given to it by residents of the Sugarlands, a valley to the north of the mountain that was home to a small Appalachian community before the national park was formed. Before the Sugarlands was reforested, Chimney Tops was clearly visible from most of the valley. Local legend even suggested that the top of the mountain was covered in soot.

Access

A common route to closely see the peaks is the Chimney Tops Trail, which can be accessed about 6.9 miles southeast of the Sugarlands Visitor Center on Newfound Gap Road. Another route follows the Appalachian Trail west from Newfound Gap to the Road Prong Trail. The Road Prong Trail, following the river at the base of the mountain, connects the Appalachian Trail with the Chimney Tops Trail. This route is twice as long as the route from the Chimney Tops parking lot.

From the summit, Mount Le Conte and Mount Kephart can be seen in the east, Sugarland Mountain in the west, and the Sugarlands valley in the north. A severe fire in late 2016 led to closure of many trails in the Great Smoky Mountains, including in the Chimney Tops area. The trail reopened in October 2017, with a new observation area that offers a place to view both of the bare rock points of the summit. However, the extreme heat of the fires resulted in accelerated weathering and potential mass wasting of the exposed rock, and therefore access to the summit is no longer permitted for safety reasons.

References

External links
 
 
  Contains an excellent section on the geology of Chimney Tops.

Mountains of Great Smoky Mountains National Park
Mountains of Tennessee
Natural history of the Great Smoky Mountains
Protected areas of Sevier County, Tennessee
Religious places of the indigenous peoples of North America
History of the Cherokee
Mountains of Sevier County, Tennessee